Yantikovsky District (Tăvay rayonĕ) is an administrative and municipal district (raion), one of the twenty-one in the Chuvash Republic, Russia. It is located in the east of the republic and borders with the Republic of Tatarstan in the south and east, Kanashsky District in the west, and with Urmarsky District in the north. Its administrative center is the rural locality (a selo) of Yantikovo. Population:  The population of Yantikovo accounts for 19.2% of the district's total population.

History
The district was formed on January 9, 1935.

Demographics
Over 90% of the district's population is Chuvash.

Notable people
Vera Kuzmina (1923–2021), theatre actress, born in Yanshikhovo-Norvashi
Ille Takhti (1889–1938), writer and folklorist, born in the village of Nüškassi

See also
Yanshikhovo-Norvashi

References

Notes

Sources

Districts of Chuvashia